The 1969 New Hampshire Wildcats football team was an American football team that represented the University of New Hampshire as a member of the Yankee Conference during the 1969 NCAA College Division football season. In its second year under head coach Jim Root, the team compiled a 3–5 record (1–4 against conference opponents) and tied for last place in the Yankee Conference.

Schedule

References

New Hampshire
New Hampshire Wildcats football seasons
New Hampshire Wildcats football